100 mm air defence gun KS-19 was a Soviet anti-aircraft gun. Initially deployed aboard ships as the B-34 during the Second World War, a ground-mounted version was introduced into service after the war as the KS-19.

The KS-19 is a heavy towed anti aircraft gun that has largely disappeared from front line arsenals due to increased use of more effective surface-to-air missiles. Being a towed weapon an external form of mobility was required, usually an AT-S Medium or AT-T Heavy tracked artillery tractor. The 15 man crew were carried on the tractor along with ready use ammunition for the gun. Ammunition was loaded as a single round into the loading tray and a well trained crew could fire 15 rounds maximum per minute.

Anti Aircraft ammunition includes high explosive, high explosive fragmentation and fragmentation types. The KS-19's onboard sights can be used to engage air targets; however increased accuracy was achieved if used in conjunction with a fire control radar such as the SON 9 (NATO Reporting name 'Fire Can') and PUAZO-6/19 director.

As the KS-19 is a heavy calibre Anti-Aircraft gun it also has some utility in the ground role especially against armored targets and as artillery. As a result of this two armor piecing rounds were produced: the AP-T (Armor Piercing-Tracer) and APC-T (Armor Piercing Capped-Tracer) with the AP-T round reportedly able to penetrate 185 mm of armor at 1000 m.

The KS-19 was used in action by communist forces in both Korea and Vietnam, and by Russian forces during their 2022 invasion of Ukraine.

Operators
Current
  – Unknown 
  – 50
  – Unknown
  – 4
 
  – 12
  – 18
  
 
 
  – 100+
  Transnistria
  
 

Former operators
  
 
 
 
  – Produced as Type 59 
  
 
 
 
 
  
  – Withdrawn from service in late 1950s.
 
 
 
 
  – Status unknown

References

External links

Sa'eer Iranian upgrade of Russian made KS-19 technical data sheet
Globalsecurity.org

Anti-aircraft guns of the Soviet Union
100 mm artillery
Weapons and ammunition introduced in 1948